USS Ludlow has been the name of three ships in the United States Navy.  The second and third ships were named for Lieutenant Augustus C. Ludlow.

 , a row galley of about 40 tons. Was built on Lake Champlain in 1808. She participated in the Battle of Plattsburgh, which ended on 11 September 1814.
 , a Wickes-class destroyer  who served from 1918 until 1930. It was scrapped and sold on 10 March 1931.
 , a Gleaves-class destroyer who served for America from 1941 until 1951. Transferred to Greece on 22 January 1951, and broken up for scrap in 1972. 

United States Navy ship names